This article discusses notable unsolved problems in linguistics.

Some of the issues below are commonly recognized as unsolved problems; i.e., it is generally agreed that no solution is known. Others may be described as controversies; i.e., although there is no common agreement about the answer, there are established schools of thought that believe they have a correct answer.

Concepts

 Is there a universal definition of word?
 Is there a universal definition of syllable?
 Is there a universal definition of sentence?
 Are there any universal grammatical categories?
 Is syntactic structure constructed of part-whole relations of syntactic constituents or is it built of an asymmetrical dependency relation between words?
 Can the elements contained in words (morphemes) and the elements contained in sentences (words or syntactic constituents) be shown to follow the same principles of combination?
 How are domains for phonological processes related to syntactic structure? Do prosodic domains deviate from syntactic constituent structure?
 Is it possible to formally delineate languages from each other? That is to say, is it possible to use linguistic (rather than social) criteria to draw a clear boundary between two closely related languages with a dialect continuum between their respective standard forms (e.g. Occitan and Catalan)?
 How does grammaticalization function?
 What constitutes grammatical language, as viewed by native speakers of that particular language, i.e. the problem of gradient well-formedness?
 Is there one universal process with which the evolution of creole languages can be tracked?
 How does lexical substitution function given the potentially limitless number of different contexts, the limits of one's knowledge and the limits of one's understanding and usage of language?
 How do idiolects and dialects emerge? Are there any common patterns in their development? Can they be quantitatively and qualitatively measured at all and if so, how?

Philosophy of language

What is language?
Is the basic structure of language an innate Universal Grammar or is it a socially learned behavior structured by the functions to which language is put in human interaction? 
 How do intension, comprehension, reference, intention and intentionality, extension, linguistic relativity, context, ambiguity, polysemy, idiolect, dialect, among other major linguistics concepts, interplay to give rise to meaningful language as spoken or written by an individual?

Historical linguistics and the evolution of language

The evolution of language
 How and when did language originate?
 How and when did different modes of language (spoken, signed, written) originate?
 Were Homo sapiens  the first humans to use language? What about other species in the genus Homo?
 Is language continuous or discontinuous with earlier forms of communication? Did language appear suddenly or gradually?

Language classification
 What language families are valid?
 Are any macro-families valid?
 Can any of the approximately 100 unclassified languages be classified? Or does our limited knowledge of them prevent that?
 Can we decipher any of the extant undeciphered writing systems?
 Language isolates have no demonstrated relatives, and essentially form language families on their own. Can any of the approximately 159 language isolates be shown to be related to other languages?
 Can we use the comparative method to reconstruct back to an arbitrary time depth, or do we need new methods to reconstruct the distant past of languages? Is there a time depth beyond which we cannot reconstruct? 
 Can we ever demonstrate, or disprove, that all languages are ultimately related to each other?

Psycholinguistics

 Language emergence:
 Emergence of grammar
 Language acquisition:
 Controversy: infant language acquisition/first-language acquisition. How are infants able to learn language? One line of debate is between two points of view: that of psychological nativism, i.e., the language ability is somehow  "hardwired" in the human brain, and usage based theories of language, according to which language emerges through to brain's interaction with environment and activated by general dispositions for social interaction and communication, abstract symbolic thought and pattern recognition and inference. 
 Is the human ability to use syntax based on innate mental structures or is syntactic speech the function of intelligence and interaction with other humans? The question is closely related to those of language emergence and acquisition.
 Is there a language acquisition device: How localized is language in the brain? Is there a particular area in the brain responsible for the development of language abilities or is it only partially localized?
 What fundamental reasons explain why ultimate attainment in second-language acquisition is typically some way short of the native speaker's ability, with learners varying widely in performance?
 What are the optimal ways to achieve successful second-language acquisition?
 Animals and language: How much human language can animals be taught to use? How much of animal communication can be said to have the same properties as human language (e.g. compositionality of bird calls as syntax)?
 What role does linguistic intuition play, how is it formed and how does it function? Is it closely linked to exposure to a unique set of different experiences and their contexts throughout one's personal life?
Linguistic relativity: What are the relations between grammatical patterns and cognitive habits of speakers of different languages? Does language use train or habituate speakers to certain cognitive habits that differ between speakers of different languages? Are effects of linguistic relativity caused by grammar structures or by cultural differences that underlie differences in language use.

Sociolinguistics

 How to deal with variation in language (including idiolects, dialects, sociolects, jargons, argots, etc.) to achieve effective and successful communication between individuals and between groups, i.e. what are the best ways to ensure efficient communication without misunderstandings: in everyday life and in educational, scientific and philosophical discussions?
 What are the best ways to quantitatively and qualitatively compare language use between individuals and between groups?
 How does time (and the semantic change that it brings) and physical age influence language use?
 What causes linguistic features to begin to undergo language change at some points in time and in some dialects but not others? (This is known as the "actuation problem".)

Computational linguistics

 Is perfect computational word-sense disambiguation attainable by using software? If yes, how and why? If no, why? (This presupposes the solution to the unsolved problems in the other areas of linguistics as a basis.)
 Is accurate computational word-sense induction feasible? If yes, how and why? If not, why?

Lexicology and lexicography

 What makes a good dictionary?
 To what extent are dictionaries reliable in terms of their supposed universality when spoken language is constantly changing (semantic change, semantic extension, semantic compression, etc.)?
 What are good practices to avoid circular definitions in dictionaries? Is it possible to eliminate them at all, given the vagueness, polysemy, etc. in all languages?
 What are the best ways to ensure efficient communication without misunderstandings: in everyday life and in educational, scientific and philosophical discussions? Is total terminology standardization attainable at all? If yes, does it involve the mass use of freely available and easily accessible terminology databases?
 To what extent are termbases reliable and can their reliability be measured objectively? If yes, how and why? If no, why? What is the relationship between termbases and individual subjectivity and can subjectivity about word sense disambiguation be overcome at all or is it a natural result of different experiences in one's unique personal life?
 How to successfully reduce lexicographic errors and lexicographic information costs?

Translation
 Is there an objective gauge for the quality of translation?
 What are the best strategies for quality translation: fidelity or transparency, dynamic or formal equivalence, etc.?
 What are the best ways to deal with untranslatability, e.g. lexical gaps?
 How to best deal with translation loss and its accumulation, e.g. when translating from a translation (see Chinese whispers)?
 Can machine translations ever achieve the high degree of comprehensibility and quality of translations translated by a good professional human translator?
 What are the effective ways to achieve proper localization and internationalization?

Other
 Is there an objective way to determine which are the most difficult languages?
 To what extent are conlangs usable and useful as used as natural languages by humans?

References

External links

Unsolved problems
Lists of unsolved problems
Unsolved problems